Events from the year 1997 in Argentina

Incumbents
 President: Carlos Menem
 Vice president: Carlos Ruckauf

Governors
Governor of Buenos Aires Province: Eduardo Duhalde 
Governor of Catamarca Province: Arnoldo Castillo
Governor of Chaco Province: Ángel Rozas
Governor of Chubut Province: Carlos Maestro
Governor of Córdoba: Ramón Mestre 
Governor of Corrientes Province: Raúl Rolando Romero Feris (until 10 December); Pedro Braillard Poccard (from 10 December)
Governor of Entre Ríos Province: Jorge Busti 
Governor of Formosa Province: Gildo Insfrán 
Governor of Jujuy Province: Carlos Ferraro
Governor of La Pampa Province: Rubén Marín 
Governor of La Rioja Province: Ángel Maza
Governor of Mendoza Province: Arturo Lafalla
Governor of Misiones Province: Ramón Puerta 
Governor of Neuquén Province: Felipe Sapag
Governor of Río Negro Province: Pablo Verani 
Governor of Salta Province: Juan Carlos Romero 
Governor of San Juan Province: Jorge Escobar
Governor of San Luis Province: Adolfo Rodríguez Saá
Governor of Santa Cruz Province: Néstor Kirchner
Governor of Santa Fe Province: Jorge Obeid 
Governor of Santiago del Estero: Carlos Juárez
Governor of Tierra del Fuego: 
 until 4 November: José Arturo Estabillo 
 4 November-10 December: Miguel Ángel Castro
 from 10 December: José Arturo Estabillo
Governor of Tucumán: Antonio Domingo Bussi

Vice Governors
Vice Governor of Buenos Aires Province: Rafael Romá 
Vice Governor of Catamarca Province: Simón Hernández
Vice Governor of Chaco Province: Miguel Pibernus 
Vice Governor of Corrientes Province: Lázaro Chiappe (until 10 December); Víctor Hugo Maidana (from 10 December)
Vice Governor of Entre Rios Province: Héctor Alanis
Vice Governor of Formosa Province: Floro Bogado
Vice Governor of Jujuy Province: vacant 
Vice Governor of La Pampa Province: Manuel Baladrón 
Vice Governor of La Rioja Province: Miguel Ángel Asís
Vice Governor of Misiones Province: Julio Alberto Ifrán
Vice Governor of Nenquen Province: Ricardo Corradi 
Vice Governor of Rio Negro Province: Bautista Mendioroz
Vice Governor of Salta Province: Walter Wayar
Vice Governor of San Juan Province: Rogelio Rafael Cerdera
Vice Governor of San Luis Province: Mario Merlo
Vice Governor of Santa Cruz: Eduardo Arnold 
Vice Governor of Santa Fe Province: Gualberto Venesia
Vice Governor of Santiago del Estero: Darío Moreno
Vice Governor of Tierra del Fuego: Miguel Ángel Castro

Events
13 April - The 1997 Argentine Grand Prix is held at the Autódromo Oscar Alfredo Gálvez in Buenos Aires, and is won by Jacques Villeneuve.
14 September - The 1997 Buenos Aires Grand Prix is held at the Autódromo Oscar Alfredo Gálvez and won by Gabriel Furlán. 
26 October - The Argentine legislative election is dominated by the Justicialist Party, who win 119 seats.  The Alliance for Work, Justice and Education, with a larger share of the vote, wins only 110 seats.   The results anticipate the end of President Menem's dominance of Argentine politics.
date unknown - La Voz del Interior, the leading daily newspaper of Córdoba, is acquired by the Clarín Group.

Deaths
29 January - Osvaldo Soriano, journalist and writer (born 1943)

See also

List of Argentine films of 1997

References

 
Years of the 20th century in Argentina
Argentina
1990s in Argentina
Argentina